Richard Rogalski is an American economist, currently the George J. Records Professor at Tuck School of Business, Dartmouth College.

References

External links

Year of birth missing (living people)
Living people
Dartmouth College faculty
American economists